The International Bryozoology Association (IBA) is a professional association with international membership specialising in research of the phylum Bryozoa.

History
The International Bryozoology Association was founded in May 1965 in Stockholm, Sweden. The first conference was held in August 1968 in Milan, Italy.

Since then the IBA's conferences have been held every three years in a different city:

 1st Conference: 1968, Milan, Italy (Proceedings published 1968)
 2nd Conference: 1971, Durham, UK (Proceedings published 1973)
 3rd Conference: 1974, Lyon, France (Proceedings published 1975)
 4th Conference: 1977, Woods Hole, MA, USA (Proceedings published 1979)
 5th Conference: 1980, Durham, UK (Proceedings published 1981)
 6th Conference: 1983, Vienna, Austria (Proceedings published 1985)
 7th Conference: 1986, Bellingham, Washington, USA (Proceedings published 1987)
 8th Conference: 1989, Paris, France (Proceedings published 1991)
 9th Conference: 1992, Swansea, UK (Proceedings published 1994)
 10th Conference: 1995, Wellington, New Zealand (proceedings published 1996)
 11th Conference: 1998, Panama (Proceedings published 2000)
 12th Conference: 2001, Dublin, Ireland (Proceedings published 2002)

 13th Conference: 2004, Concepción, Chile (Proceedings published 2005)

 14th Conference: 2007, Boone, NC, USA (proceedings published 2008)
 15th Conference: 2010, Kiel, Germany (Proceedings published 2012)
 16th Conference: 2013, Catania, Italy (Proceedings published 2014)
 17th Conference: 2016, Melbourne, Australia
 18th Conference: 2019, Liberec, Czech Republic

There are approximately 250 registered members of the IBA from across the world.

References

External links
International Bryozoology Association official website

Zoological nomenclature
Bryozoology